These are the official results of the Men's 200 metres event at the 1982 European Championships in Athens, Greece, held at Olympic Stadium "Spiros Louis" on 8 and 9 September 1982.

Medalists

Results

Final
9 September
Wind: -0.6 m/s

Semi-finals
8 September

Semi-final 1
Wind: -1.1 m/s

Semi-final 2
Wind: 0.7 m/s

Heats
8 September

Heat 1
Wind: -0.1 m/s

Heat 2
Wind: -0.8 m/s

Heat 3
Wind: -0.2 m/s

Heat 4
Wind: 0.6 m/s

Participation
According to an unofficial count, 24 athletes from 14 countries participated in the event.

 (1)
 (2)
 (3)
 (1)
 (3)
 (2)
 (3)
 (1)
 (2)
 (1)
 (1)
 (1)
 (1)
 (2)

See also
 1978 Men's European Championships 200 metres (Prague)
 1980 Men's Olympic 200 metres (Moscow)
 1983 Men's World Championships 200 metres (Helsinki)
 1984 Men's Olympic 200 metres (Los Angeles)
 1986 Men's European Championships 200 metres (Stuttgart)
 1987 Men's World Championships 200 metres (Rome)
 1988 Men's Olympic 200 metres (Seoul)

References

 Results

200 metres
200 metres at the European Athletics Championships